Terence Turner (1935–2015) was an anthropologist. He was professor emeritus of anthropology at the University of Chicago.

Turner did extensive ethnographic and activist work with the Kayapo from central Brazil. He also used an anthropological understanding to address broader regional and global development.

Selected publications
 Turner, Terence (2017). The fire of the jaguar. Hau Books,Chicago, Illinois :
 Turner, T. S. (2012). The social skin. Journal of Ethnographic Theory, 2(2), 486-504.
 Turner, T. S. (1979). Anthropology and the politics of indigenous peoples' struggles. Cambridge anthropology, 1-43.

References

1935 births
2015 deaths
American anthropologists